The GER Classes S46, D56 and H88 (classified Classes D14, D15, and D16 by the London and North Eastern Railway) were three classes of similar 4-4-0 steam locomotive designed by James Holden (S46 and D56) and A. J. Hill (H88) for the Great Eastern Railway.

They were given the nickname Claud Hamilton after the pioneer engine of the class, named after Lord Claud Hamilton (1843–1925) the chairman of the Great Eastern Railway. The D56 class of 1903-4 evolved the design to include a square-topped Belpaire firebox. The H88 class of 1923 featured a larger superheated boiler, leading them to be known as Super Clauds. Many earlier members of the class were rebuilt during their working life.

During the Edwardian era, they were the flagship express locomotive on the Great Eastern Main Line, and although displaced on the heaviest express trains by the larger S69 class from 1911 (itself a 4-6-0 development of the Claud design), members of the class were used on passenger and goods services throughout the Eastern Region until 1960. No locomotives of the three classes survived to preservation.

Design

The Claud Hamilton, particularly in its original GER blue livery, is widely considered one of the most elegant locomotive designs of the pre-grouping era.

In his 1955 history of the Great Eastern Railway, Cecil J. Allen devotes a whole chapter to the class and noted that Of all the locomotive designs that emerged from Stratford Works during the reign of James Holden, the one destined to achieve the greatest fame, beyond question, was his Claud Hamilton type 4-4-0, of which the pioneer example, No. 1900 Claud Hamilton, took the rails in 1900.

Although credited to James Holden, the Locomotive Superintendent of the Great Eastern, Frederick Vernon Russell (Holden's Chief Designer) is thought to have contributed substantially to the design of the Claud Hamiltons; while researching his Some Classic Locomotives of 1949, C.H. Ellis was informed by Russell that during the process of designing the locomotive "Mr Holden, by then a valetudinarian was making a long recuperative stay in Egypt."

The 4-4-0 inside cylinder locomotive included a number of features that were to appear on later Great Eastern locomotive classes, including a circular polished steel smokebox door surround (instead of the usual horizontal straps) and decorative splashers. Class pioneer No 1900 Claud Hamilton featuring red lining and connecting rods, copper chimney cap and GER coat of arms was much admired when it was exhibited at the 1900 Paris Exposition.

The original S46 boiler had  of heating surface, with a  grate. The cylinders were 19 x 26 in. with flat valves placed below, operated by Stephenson's motion.

As built, the S46s were all fired by oil, using Holden's patented oil-burning apparatus which used a bed of fire brick, a supply of air fed from a pre-heater in the smokebox and steam-powered injectors which sprayed atomised oil onto the firebed. The firebox was heated, and steam for the injectors initially generated, by burning coal before switching to oil. The oil burnt was a waste product of the GER's gasworks that produced Pintsch gas for lighting its carriages. The GER had previously been fined for discharging this waste product into the River Lea, and  the railway was thus able to fuel its oil-burning locomotives at little extra cost.

The first ten of the D56 types were also built as oil-burners, but during the 1900s the increasing use of electric lighting in carriages and growing industrial demand for fuel oil meant that it was no longer cost-effective to use it as a locomotive fuel. Holden had always intended that his oil-burning system would allow engines so fitted to be easily converted to burn coal if required, and all the S46s and D56s had been switched to coal-burning by the end of 1911. When oil prices were low or coal was in short supply due to strike action some examples were re-fitted to burn oil for short periods but this was not done past 1927.

Allen reports that Claud Hamiltons in their original state were capable of taking around 350 tons from Liverpool Street to North Walsham in under the booked time. Even heavier trains were managed in the up direction: No. 1809 (Belpaire boiler) took 400 tons up in 157 minutes 24 seconds.

The S46 design was substantially modified in later incarnations, particularly with the introduction of a larger superheated boiler on the H88 designed by Alfred John Hill. Most earlier members of the class were substantially modified by Hill or during the tenure of Sir Nigel Gresley as CME of the LNER from 1923.

Two separate classes were also developed from the design of the Claud Hamilton; Holden's Class F48 (constructed between 1900 and 1903) was essentially an 0-6-0 goods version of the S46 and the Class S69 (built between 1911 and 1921) was a larger 4-6-0 version using many of the same design cues as the H88, built to replace the Clauds on the heaviest express trains.

Classification and numbering

The classification of the Claud Hamiltons is complex but is summarised here:

 GER Class S46 (LNER Class D14), 4 ft 9 in diameter boiler, round-top firebox
 GER Class D56 (LNER Class D15), 4 ft 9 in diameter boiler, Belpaire firebox
 LNER Class D15/1, D15 as built with short smokebox, some with superheater
 LNER Class D15/2, D15 with superheater and long smokebox
 GER Class H88 (LNER Class D16), "Super Claud" with superheater, larger boiler (5 ft  in diameter) and Belpaire firebox
 LNER Class D16/1, D16 as built (with short smokebox)
 LNER Class D16/2, as D16/1 but with extended smokebox
 LNER Class D16/3, Gresley rebuild of D15 and D16 with round-top firebox, some with piston valves

The class pioneer was numbered 1900 (to coincide with the year the locomotive was built), with subsequent batches numbered backwards in tens as follows:

The Railway Magazine of November 1923 includes the log of a run from Liverpool Street to Ipswich with 4-4-0 number 1780, so this loco at least must have carried a GER number.

Appearance

Originally painted in GER blue with red lining and bronze highlights, following the 1923 grouping the GER became part of the London and North Eastern Railway, and were painted in the company's apple green with LNER on the tender and cab-side numbers. Side rods were polished steel. The appearance was altered when a larger boiler and Belpaire firebox was fitted, meaning a change in the cab window shape as well.

8783 and 8787 were kept in immaculate condition as dedicated Royal locos for hauling the Royal Train from King's Cross to Wolferton (the nearest station for Sandringham House). 8783 was also fitted with a copper-capped chimney. Later some locos carried numbers and London & North Eastern Railway on the tender. During the Second World War most were repainted into unlined black livery with the letters "N E" on the tender. "Royal Claud" 8783 retained its LNER apple green livery into British Railways days (after 1948), but with BRITISH RAILWAYS on the tender initially.

Others were painted black with BRITISH RAILWAYS on the tender. Later on they carried both lined and unlined black with the early BR crest and those which survived after 1956 lined and unlined black with the later crest. Many of the class retained steel smokebox door rings until withdrawal, except those rebuilt by Gresley with a larger boiler which also required a new smokebox. Many locos had their decorative valances removed in later years as well, though they still retained their distinctive character.

Accidents and incidents

Ten people were killed and more than 500 were injured.
On 12 February 1927, locomotive No. 8808 was hauling an express passenger train that was in collision with a lorry on a level crossing at Tottenham, London. Due to foggy conditions, the train was not travelling at a high speed.
On 17 January 1931, locomotive No. 8781 was running light engine at Great Holland, Essex when it was in a head-on collision with a newspaper train. Two people were killed and two were seriously injured. The newspaper train had departed from  station against signals.
On 27 November 1934,  D15/2 No. 8896 locomotive was derailed at Wormley, Hertfordshire when it collided with a lorry on a level crossing. Both engine crew were killed.

Withdrawals
Withdrawals of the class began in 1945, with the final member, a D16/3, scrapped in 1960 leaving no survivors of the class.

Revival
A group based at the Whitwell & Reepham railway plan to build a replica of D16/2 No. 8783 to be named Phoenix.

In fiction
The design was the basis of the character Molly in the children's TV series Thomas the Tank Engine and Friends.

References

Bibliography

External links

 Great Eastern Railway Society: Classes S46/D56/H88
 LNER Encyclopedia: Classes S46/D56/H88
 Claud Hamilton Locomotive Group

S46

4-4-0 locomotives
Railway locomotives introduced in 1900
Scrapped locomotives
Standard gauge steam locomotives of Great Britain
Passenger locomotives